State elections were held in South Australia on 9 and 16 April 1921. All 46 seats in the South Australian House of Assembly were up for election. The incumbent Liberal Union government led by Premier of South Australia Henry Barwell defeated the opposition Australian Labor Party led by Leader of the Opposition John Gunn. Each district elected multiple members, with voters casting multiple votes.

The coalition between the National Labor Party and the Liberal Union had collapsed in 1920, and the National Labor Party contested the election as the Progressive Country Party.

|}

See also
 Results of the 1921 South Australian state election (House of Assembly)
 Candidates of the South Australian state election, 1921
 Members of the South Australian House of Assembly, 1921–1924
 Members of the South Australian Legislative Council, 1921–1924

References

History of South Australian elections 1857-2006, volume 1: ECSA
State and federal election results in Australia since 1890

Elections in South Australia
1921 elections in Australia
1920s in South Australia
April 1921 events